A heptahedron (plural: heptahedra) is a polyhedron having seven sides, or faces.

A heptahedron can take a large number of different basic forms, or topologies. The most familiar are the hexagonal pyramid and the pentagonal prism. Also notable is the tetrahemihexahedron, which can be seen as a tessellation of the real projective plane. No heptahedra are regular.

Topologically distinct heptahedron

Convex
There are 34 topologically distinct convex heptahedra, excluding mirror images. (Two polyhedra are "topologically distinct" if they have intrinsically different arrangements of faces and vertices, such that it is impossible to distort one into the other simply by changing the lengths of edges or the angles between edges or faces.) 

An example of each type is depicted below, along with the number of sides on each of the faces. The images are ordered by descending number of six-sided faces (if any), followed by descending number of five-sided faces (if any), and so on.

Concave

One particularly interesting example is the Szilassi polyhedron, a Toroidal polyhedron with 7 non-convex six sided faces.

References

External links
Polyhedra with 4–7 Faces by Steven Dutch

Polyhedra